Dharamgarh is one of the sub-divisional headquarters in the district of Kalahandi in Odisha, India and it is one of the three Notified Area Councils in Kalahandi. It is also referred as Dharmagarh. Dharamgarh is known as the granary of Kalahandi district. The Dharamgarh sub-division of Kalahandi includes Golamunda, Koksara, Jaipatna, Kalampur, Junagarh and Dharamgarh blocks.

History and economy

Dharamgarh became a sub-divisional headquarter in post-independence period when Kalahandi joined Odisha state. Dharamgarh sub-division is historically well known for rice production in the region. In post Upper Indravati irrigation project it among the leading rice producing sub-division in Odisha. Kalahandi contributed largest number of rice mill, out of which majority of the rice mills are in Dharamgarh sub-division.

References

External links 
 kalahandi.nic.in
 www.dharamgarh.in 

Cities and towns in Kalahandi district